The Lalpir Power Company Limited, was incorporated in 1994, located in Mehmood Kot, District Muzaffargarh, Punjab, Pakistan. Lal Pir Power Plant produces 362 MW of electricity whereas PakGen produces 365MW of electricity. It is owned by Nishat Group.

Nichimen Japan was hired as an EPC contractor. The plant started its operation in 1997 and was operated by an American company AES Corporation.

In 2010, Nishat Group and consortium acquired the two plants, AES Lalpir and PakGen. Nishat Group would have controlling shares of 50 percent, whereas Abu Dhabi Investment Council (ADIC), which is owned by the Government of Abu Dhabi, would have 30 percent shares, and The City School would have 20 percent shares.

The company is listed on the Pakistan Stock Exchange.

References

External links 
 Lalpir Power Company

Electric power companies of Pakistan
Companies listed on the Pakistan Stock Exchange
Nishat Group
Muzaffargarh District
2010 mergers and acquisitions
1994 establishments in Pakistan